Tejano Run (May 5, 1992 – 2011) is an American Thoroughbred racehorse who came second in the 1995 Kentucky Derby to Thunder Gulch.

Background
Tejano Run was bred by Catesby Woodford Clay at his Runnymede Farm outside Paris, Kentucky. He was bought and raced by Roy and Joyce Monroe and was trained by Kenneth McPeek.

Racing career
As a two-year-old, Tejano Run won the Breeders' Futurity Stakes and Kentucky Cup Juvenile Stakes.

As a three-year-old, he came second to Thunder Gulch in the 1995 Kentucky Derby. He then ran ninth to Timber Country in the Preakness Stakes.

As a four and five-year-old, Tejano Run won on both the dirt and turf. He set a new stakes record in winning the 1996 Maker's Mark Mile Stakes on turf at Keeneland Racecourse. He also won the 1996 Pioneer Stakes and 1997 Fall Championship Stakes at Turfway Park. The Pioneer Stakes was renamed in his honor. Ridden by Pat Day in the 1997 Widener Handicap on dirt at Hialeah Park, Tejano Run earned a Beyer Speed Figure of 123.

Stud career
Retired to stud duty in Kentucky, since the 2006 breeding season Tejano Run has been standing at Michael and Chris Blake's Ascot Stud at Port Colborne, Ontario, Canada. Among his progeny are:
 One For Rose - three-time Canadian Champion; career earnings $1,291,303
 Anglian Prince (b. 1999) - won Marine Stakes; career earnings $685,577
Shaws Creek (b. 1999) - won Clarendon Stakes, Plate Trial Stakes; career earnings $628,130
 Dionisia (b. 2003) - Italian Champion Two-Year-Old Filly (2005), Italian Champion Three-Year-Old Filly (2006)

References

External links
 Video at YouTube of Tejano Run winning the 1997 Widener Handicap

1992 racehorse births
2011 racehorse deaths
Racehorses bred in Kentucky
Racehorses trained in the United States
Thoroughbred family 22-d